José Patrício served as the ambassador of Angola to the United Nations from 2000 to 2001. He replaced Afonso Van-Dúnem M'Binda and preceded Gaspar Martins.

References

José Patrício served as an Angolan Ambassador to the United Nations and has previously served as Angolan Ambassador to Portugal and, also opene country's embassy in Washington D.C in 1993. Prior to that, Ambassador Patrício served as Information Secretary in the Office of the President. In 1993 he was named by the World Economic Forum as one of the 200 Leaders of the Future.

Permanent Representatives of Angola to the United Nations
Living people
Year of birth missing (living people)
Ambassadors of Angola to Portugal